Orchard Creek is a stream in Oregon County in the Ozarks of southern Missouri. It is a tributary of the Warm Fork Spring River.

Orchard Creek, historically called "Orchard Branch", was so named on account of orchards near its course.

See also
List of rivers of Missouri

References

Rivers of Oregon County, Missouri
Rivers of Missouri